Zhalgas Mukhambet (born August 29, 1988) better known as Zhalgas Zhumagulov, is a Kazakh mixed martial artist who competes in the Flyweight division of the Ultimate Fighting Championship.

Mixed martial arts career

Early career
Zhumagulov hails from Kazakhstan and sported a 13-3 MMA record before entering the UFC, with notable wins including Tagir Ulanbekov, Tyson Nam at Fight Nights Global 86, Shaj Hague, Artur Bagautinov, and others.

He won the Fight Nights Global Flyweight Championship defeating fellow future UFC fighter Tagir Ulanbekov at Fight Nights Global 88. His last bout before signing with the UFC was in October 2019, where he edged former UFC flyweight title challenger Ali Bagautinov via split decision in the Fight Nights Global 95 main event.

Ultimate Fighting Championship
Zhumagulov made his promotional debut against Raulian Paiva on July 11, 2020, at UFC 251. At the weigh ins, Paiva weighed in at 129 pounds, 3 pounds over the flyweight non-title limit. He was fined 20% of his purse, which went to Zhumagulov. The bout proceeded at catchweight. He lost the fight via controversial unanimous decision. 16 out of 20 media outlets scored the bout as a win for Zhumagulov.

Zhumagulov was scheduled to face Amir Albazi at UFC on ESPN: Smith vs. Clark, but Zhumagulov pulled out due to visa issues and the bout was rescheduled for this UFC 257 on January 24, 2021. He lost the bout via unanimous decision.

Zhumagulov faced Jerome Rivera on July 10, 2021, at UFC 264.  He won the fight via a guillotine choke in round one.

Zhumagulov faced Manel Kape on December 4, 2021, at UFC on ESPN 31. He lost the fight via technical knockout in round one.

Zhumagulov faced Jeff Molina on June 4, 2022, at UFC Fight Night: Volkov vs. Rozenstruik. He lost the bout via controversial split decision. 12 out of 13 media scores gave it to Zhumagulov.

Zhumagulov faced former LFA flyweight champion Charles Johnson at UFC Fight Night 215. He lost the fight via split decision. 12 out of 13 media outlets scored the fight in favor of Zhumagulov.

Zhumagulov is scheduled to face Nate Maness on May 6, 2023 at UFC 288.

Personal life 
Zhumagulov has two wives and 6 children.

Championships and accomplishments

Mixed martial arts 

 Fight Nights Global
Fight Nights Global Flyweight Championship (One time)
One successful defense

Mixed martial arts record 

|-
|Loss
|align=center|14–8
|Charles Johnson
|Decision (split)
|UFC Fight Night: Nzechukwu vs. Cuțelaba
|
|align=center|3
|align=center|5:00
||Las Vegas, Nevada, United States
|
|-
|Loss
|align=center|14–7
|Jeff Molina
|Decision (split) 
|UFC Fight Night: Volkov vs. Rozenstruik
|
|align=center|3
|align=center|5:00
|Las Vegas, Nevada, United States
|
|-
|Loss
|align=center|14–6
|Manel Kape
|TKO (punches)
|UFC on ESPN: Font vs. Aldo 
|
|align=center|1
|align=center|4:02
|Las Vegas, Nevada, United States
|
|-
|Win
|align=center|14–5
|Jerome Rivera
|Submission (guillotine choke)
|UFC 264
|
|align=center|1
|align=center|2:02
|Las Vegas, Nevada, United States
|
|-
| Loss
| align=center| 13–5
|Amir Albazi
|Decision (unanimous)
|UFC 257 
|
|align=center|3
|align=center|5:00
|Abu Dhabi, United Arab Emirates
|
|-
| Loss
| align=center| 13–4
| Raulian Paiva
|Decision (unanimous)
|UFC 251 
|
|align=center|3
|align=center|5:00
|Abu Dhabi, United Arab Emirates
|
|-
| Win
| align=center| 13–3
| Ali Bagautinov
|Decision (split)
|Fight Nights Global 95
|
|align=center|5
|align=center|5:00
|Sochi, Russia
|
|-
| Win
| align=center| 12–3
| Tagir Ulanbekov
|Decision (majority)
|Fight Nights Global 88 
|
|align=center|5
|align=center|5:00
|Astana, Kazakhstan
|
|-
| Win
| align=center| 11–3
| Tyson Nam
|Decision (unanimous)
|Fight Nights Global 86
|
|align=center|5
|align=center|5:00
|Almaty, Kazakhstan
| 
|-
| Win
| align=center| 10–3
| Shaj Haque
| Decision (unanimous)
| Fight Nights Global 80
| 
| align=center| 3
| align=center| 5:00
| Almaty, Kazakhstan
| 
|-
| Loss
| align=center| 9–3
| Vartan Asatryan
| Decision (split)
| Fight Nights Global 65
| 
| align=center| 5
| align=center| 5:00
| Astana, Kazakhstan
|
|-
| Win
| align=center|9–2
| Artur Bagautinov
|KO (punch)
|Fight Nights Global 62
|
|align=center|2
|align=center|1:53
|Moscow, Russia
|
|-
| Win
| align=center|8–2
| Ivan Andrushchenko
|Decision (unanimous)
|Fight Nights Global 55 
|
|align=center|3
|align=center|5:00
|Moscow, Russia
|
|-
| Win
| align=center|7–2
| Oscar Dolchin
|Decision (unanimous)
|Fight Nights Global 46 
|
|align=center|3
|align=center|5:00
|Moscow, Russia
|
|-
| Loss
| align=center| 6–2
| Zhifa Shang
| Decision (split)
| Kunlun Fight: Cage Fight Series 3
| 
| align=center| 3
| align=center| 5:00
| Chongqing, China
|
|-
| Loss
| align=center| 6–1
| Vartan Asatryan
| TKO (punches)
|Alash Pride: Royal Plaza Volume 2
|
|align=center|2
|align=center|3:00
|Almaty, Kazakhstan
| 
|-
| Win
| align=center| 6–0
| Bekzat Aliev
| TKO (punches)
|rowspan=4 | Zhekpe Zhek: Bantamweight Grand Prix
|rowspan=4 |
|align=center|3
|align=center|2:10
|rowspan=4 |Astana, Kazakhstan
| 
|-
| Win
| align=center| 5–0
| Salat Biskhanov
| TKO (punches)
| align=center| 1
| align=center| 1:10
| 
|-
| Win
| align=center| 4–0
| Tyjybaev Andos
| TKO (punches)
| align=center| 3
| align=center| 2:10
| 
|-
| Win
| align=center| 3–0
| Nursulat Serker
| TKO (punches)
| align=center| 1
| align=center| 2:47
| 
|-
| Win
| align=center| 2–0
| Nurbay Mirzaliev
| TKO (submission to punches)
| White Night FC
| 
| align=center| 2
| align=center| 3:14
| Elets, Russia
|
|-
| Win
| align=center| 1–0
| Yerlan Semebekov
| TKO (Punches)
| Altay Republik MMA League
| 
| align=center| 1
| align=center| 3:54
| Gorno-Altaysk, Russia
|

See also 

 List of male mixed martial artists

References

External links
 
 

1988 births
Living people
Kazakhstani male mixed martial artists
Flyweight mixed martial artists
Ultimate Fighting Championship male fighters
People from Aktobe